Nicholas Ward (born 1630) was an Irish politician.

He was the oldest son of Bernard Ward and his wife Anne, daughter of Richard West. In 1661, he entered the Irish House of Commons, sitting for Downpatrick until 1666.

He married Sarah Buckworth, daughter of Theophilius Buckworth, and had by her two daughters and five sons. His grandson was Michael Ward.

References

1630 births
Members of the Parliament of Ireland (pre-1801) for County Down constituencies
Year of death unknown
Nicholas
Irish MPs 1661–1666